Thembile Skweyiya (17 June 1939 – 1 September 2015) was brother of Zola Skweyiya and he was a South African Constitutional Court judge from 2003 to 2014.

Skweyiya attended primary school in Cape Town, but later attended boarding school at the Healdtown Institution in the Eastern Cape where he matriculated in 1959. Justice Skweyiya earned a BSocSci degree from the University of Natal in 1963 and an LLB degree from the same  university in 1967.

Skweyiya retired from the bench of the Constitutional Court of South Africa on 6 May 2014 at the age of 73.

References

Judges of the Constitutional Court of South Africa
South African judges
1939 births
2015 deaths